Throchi Fort is a historical fort in Throchi village of Kotli district in Azad Jammu and Kashmir. The fort is situated on a hilltop overlooking the village and surrounding areas.

History 
Throchi Fort, believed to have been constructed in 1425 or 1460 by the Rajput lords of the region, was strategically positioned to protect the hamlet and its surrounding from prospective invasions and attacks.

The fort is under the administration of Pakistan Armed Forces.

References

Forts in Azad Kashmir‎
Kotli District